Siavarz (also Romanized as Sīāvarz and Sīya Varaz; also known as Siyah Varz) is a village in Baladeh Rural District, Khorramabad District, Tonekabon County, Mazandaran Province, Iran. At the 2006 census, its population was 893, in 274 families.

References 

Populated places in Tonekabon County